Chloroclystis impudicis is a moth in the family Geometridae. It is found on Campbell Island.

References

Moths described in 1964
Chloroclystis
Moths of New Zealand